The Chinese Government's Friendship Award is the People's Republic of China's highest award for "foreign experts who have made outstanding contributions to the country's economic and social progress". The award was first established in 1950s, when it was awarded to experts from the former Soviet Union and East European countries by the then premier Zhou Enlai and the foreign minister Chen Yi. On September 15, 1955, the Chinese government decreed that each departing Soviet expert be issued a medal. This medal featured the flags of China and the Soviet Union along with the inscription "Long live the Sino-Soviet Friendship". The friendship award was abolished with the Sino-Soviet split in the early 1960s. During the period that followed, in particular the Cultural Revolution, foreigners in China were often regarded as "spies" and very few remained in the country.

After the reopening of China, a new Friendship Award was reintroduced in 1991. Since then, the winners have been selected by the State Administration of Foreign Experts Affairs (SAFEA) under the State Council. The award is conferred as part of the celebrations for the National Day of the People's Republic of China (October 1). The award consist of a medal and an award certificate. The medal is decorated with a picture of the Great Wall on the obverse along with the inscription "Friendship Award" in Chinese ("友谊奖", on the top) and in English (on the bottom). Besides the national friendship award, various local foreign expert awards are also being made at the provincial, regional, and municipal levels.

, 1,799 foreigners have received the award.

Laureates

References

Academic awards in China
Chinese awards
Foreign relations of China